Mladen Mladenović (born 13 September 1964) is a Croatian professional football manager and retired player who played as a midfielder.

Playing career

Club
During his career he played for Rijeka, Zadar, Dinamo Zagreb and Hajduk Split in Croatia, CD Castellón in Spain, SV Austria Salzburg in Austria, and with Gamba Osaka in Japanese J.League. Known for his explosive shooting, Mladenović scored a total of 115 goals in 374 league games. When at Rijeka, he severely injured Hajduk's debutant player Nenad Gračan in 1986, breaking Gračan's leg.

International
He made his debut for Croatia in an October 1990 friendly match against the United States, coming on as a 58th-minute substitute for Aljoša Asanović, and earned a total of 19 caps, scoring 3 goals. Since Croatia was still part of Yugoslavia at the time, his first 3 games are unofficial. Mladenović participated at UEFA Euro 1996 and his final international was at that tournament in the quarter finals against eventual winners Germany.

Managerial career
Following his retirement from playing professional football, Mladenović started a career as a referee, as well as a manager. Since 2002, he managed NK Žminj, Rijeka, NK Halubjan, NK Cres and Orijent.

Club statistics

National team statistics

International goals

Managerial statistics

Honours
Rijeka
Yugoslav Youth Cup: 1982

Salzburg
Austrian Bundesliga: 1994–95
Austrian Supercup: 1994, 1995

Individual
SN Yellow Shirt Award: 1994
HNK Rijeka all time XI by Novi list

References

External links
 
 
 

1964 births
Living people
Footballers from Rijeka
Association football midfielders
Yugoslav footballers
Croatian footballers
Croatia international footballers
UEFA Euro 1996 players
HNK Rijeka players
NK Zadar players
GNK Dinamo Zagreb players
CD Castellón footballers
FC Red Bull Salzburg players
Gamba Osaka players
HNK Hajduk Split players
Yugoslav First League players
Segunda División players
Croatian Football League players
Austrian Football Bundesliga players
J1 League players
Croatian expatriate footballers
Expatriate footballers in Spain
Croatian expatriate sportspeople in Spain
Expatriate footballers in Austria
Croatian expatriate sportspeople in Austria
Expatriate footballers in Japan
Croatian expatriate sportspeople in Japan
Croatian football managers
HNK Rijeka managers
HNK Orijent managers
HNK Rijeka non-playing staff